Apolinaras Grigas (Russian: Аполинарас Григас; born 3 September 1945) is a Lithuanian rower who competed for the Soviet Union.

Grigas was born in Kaunas, Lithuania. At the 1967 European Rowing Championships in Vichy, he won silver with the men's eight. He competed at the 1968 Summer Olympics in Mexico City with the men's coxless pair where they did not finish in the round one repêchage. At the 1971 European Rowing Championships in Copenhagen, he won bronze with the men's eight. At the 1973 European Rowing Championships in Moscow, he won silver with the men's coxless four.

References

1945 births
Living people
Soviet male rowers
Lithuanian male rowers
Olympic rowers of the Soviet Union
Rowers at the 1968 Summer Olympics
Sportspeople from Kaunas
European Rowing Championships medalists